

Job Odebrecht (25 February 1892 – 20 November 1982) was a German general during World War II.  He was also a recipient of the Knight's Cross of the Iron Cross of Nazi Germany.

Odebrecht entered the German navy as an officer cadet in 1909 and was commissioned in 1912. After serving on flotilla craft and capital ships, he was assigned to East Africa. He commanded a company of naval troops there when World War I broke out, and was captured by the Belgians in 1916, when German East Africa fell to the Allies. 

During the inter-war period, he served as a policeman, attaining the rank of major. He joined the German air force in 1935, and was promoted to Lt. Col at the end of that year. His commands included the 1st bn., 11th flak rgt. (1936), 71st flak bn. (1937), 1st bn., 34th flak rgt. (1938), 25th flak rgt. (1938), 8th flak rgt. (1939), 5th Luftwaffe defense command (1940), 6th Luftwaffe Defense Command (1941). 

He was promoted to General der Flakartillerie on December 1, 1942.
During the rest of the War, he commanded the 6th Flak Division (1942), 21st Luftwaffe Field Division (1942), III Luftwaffe Field Corps (1943) and II Flak Corps (1944–45).

Awards and decorations

 Knight's Cross of the Iron Cross on September 5, 1944 as General der Flakartillerie and commanding general of the II. Flakkorps (motorized)

References

Citations

Bibliography

 
 Hildebrand, Karl F. Die Generale der Deutschen Luftwaffe, 1935–45, vol.3, pp. 3–5. Osnabruck, Germany: Biblio Verlag, 1992. .

1892 births
1982 deaths
Luftwaffe World War II generals
Imperial German Navy personnel of World War I
Recipients of the clasp to the Iron Cross, 1st class
Recipients of the Gold German Cross
Recipients of the Knight's Cross of the Iron Cross
German prisoners of war in World War I
Military personnel from Koblenz
People from the Rhine Province
Generals of Anti-aircraft Artillery
20th-century Freikorps personnel
German prisoners of war in World War II
Schutztruppe personnel